The Johannes Brahms Medal of Hamburg is a music award established in 1928, named after the composer Johannes Brahms who was born in Hamburg.

The medal shows a portrait of the composer. It was designed by the Hamburg sculptor Friedrich Wield. Until 1935 it was primarily given to German or Austrian composers, and for services to the musical life of Hamburg. But in 1935 international members of the Permanent Council organising Hamburg's International Festival were all awarded medals.

Selected recipients 
 1928: Karl Muck
 1929: Hamburger Philharmonisches Orchester und Orchester of the Hamburger Stadttheater
 1933: Eugen Papst, Alfred Sittard, Karl Böhm 
 1934: Richard Strauss
 1935: Hans Pfitzner, Jean Sibelius, Albert Roussel, Siegmund von Hausegger, Joseph Haas, Emil Nikolaus von Reznicek, Kurt Atterberg, Wilhelm Kienzl, Herbert Bedford
 1937: Wilhelm Furtwängler, Paul Graener, Heinrich Karl Strohm, Eugen Jochum 
 1958: Robert Casadesus, Philipp Jarnach, Joseph Keilberth, Leopold Ludwig, Günther Rennert, Hans Schmidt-Isserstedt, Heinz Tietjen, Henny Wolff
 1960: Ernst Gernot Klussmann
 1963: Robert Heger, Ilse Fromm-Michaels 
 1964: Claude Rostand, Frank Wohlfahrt
 1970: Erna Berger
 1973: Wolfgang Sawallisch, Rolf Liebermann, Emil Gilels 
 1976: Monteverdi-Chor Hamburg
 1982: Hamburger Symphoniker
 1983: Aldo Ceccato
 1987: Yehudi Menuhin
 1988: Günter Wand
 1989: Detlef Kraus
 1990: Hellmut Wormsbächer
 1991: Jürgen Jürgens
 1994: Felicitas Kukuck
 1996: Conrad Hansen
 1997: Günter Jena
 1998: NDR Sinfonieorchester
 2001: 
 2004: Hermann Rauhe
 2010: NDR Chor
 2012: Hamburger Kammermusikfreunde
 2020: Christoph von Dohnanyi

References

External links 
 Liste der Geehrten aluan.de
 Johannes-Brahms-Gesellschaft Hamburg

Johannes Brahms
German awards
Medals
Awards established in 1928
1928 establishments in Germany